Restio is a genus of flowering plants within the family Restionaceae, described in 1772. The entire genus is endemic to South Africa (Cape Province and KwaZulu-Natal).

In common with a number of other genera in the Restionaceae, restios are widely cultivated for use as garden ornamentals for their attractive nodular foliage. They are mildly frost hardy.

 Species

 Restio acockii 
 Restio adpressus 
 Restio affinis 
 Restio albotuberculatus 
 Restio alticola 
 Restio andreaeanus 
 Restio anomalus 
 Restio arcuatus 
 Restio aridus 
 Restio asperus 
 Restio aureolus 
 Restio bifarius 
 Restio bifidus 
 Restio bifurcus 
 Restio bolusii 
 Restio brachiatus 
 Restio brunneus 
 Restio burchellii 
 Restio caespitosus 
 Restio calcicola 
 Restio capensis 
 Restio capillaris 
 Restio cedarbergensis 
 Restio cincinnatus 
 Restio clandestinus 
 Restio coactilis 
 Restio colliculospermus 
 Restio communis 
 Restio confusus 
 Restio constipatus 
 Restio corneolus 
 Restio curvibracteatus 
 Restio curviramis 
 Restio cymosus 
 Restio debilis 
 Restio decipiens 
 Restio degenerans 
 Restio dispar 
 Restio distans 
 Restio distichus 
 Restio distractus 
 Restio distylis 
 Restio dodii 
 Restio durus 
 Restio duthieae 
 Restio echinatus 
 Restio egregius 
 Restio ejuncidus 
 Restio eleocharis 
 Restio elsieae 
 Restio esterhuyseniae 
 Restio exilis 
 Restio femineus 
 Restio festuciformis 
 Restio filicaulis 
 Restio filiformis 
 Restio fourcadei 
 Restio fragilis 
 Restio fraternus 
 Restio fuscidulus 
 Restio fusiformis 
 Restio gaudichaudianus 
 Restio gossypinus 
 Restio harveyi 
 Restio helenae 
 Restio hyalinus 
 Restio hystrix 
 Restio implicatus 
 Restio impolitus 
 Restio inconspicuus 
 Restio ingens 
 Restio insignis 
 Restio inveteratus 
 Restio involutus 
 Restio karooicus 
 Restio laniger 
 Restio leptoclados 
 Restio leptostachyus 
 Restio levynsiae 
 Restio longiaristatus 
 Restio luxurians 
 Restio macer 
 Restio marlothii 
 Restio micans 
 Restio miser 
 Restio mkambatiae 
 Restio monanthos 
 Restio monostylis 
 Restio montanus 
 Restio muirii 
 Restio multiflorus 
 Restio nanus 
 Restio nodosus 
 Restio nubigenus 
 Restio nudiflorus 
 Restio nuwebergensis 
 Restio obscurus 
 Restio occultus 
 Restio ocreatus 
 Restio pachystachyus 
 Restio paludicola 
 Restio paludosus 
 Restio paniculatus 
 Restio papillosus 
 Restio papyraceus 
 Restio parthenocarpos 
 Restio parvispiculus 
 Restio patens 
 Restio peculiaris 
 Restio pedicellatus 
 Restio perplexus 
 Restio perseverans 
 Restio pillansii 
 Restio praeacutus 
 Restio pratensis 
 Restio pulcher 
 Restio pulvinatus 
 Restio pumilus 
 Restio purpurascens 
 Restio pygmaeus 
 Restio quadratus 
 Restio quinquefarius 
 Restio ramosissimus 
 Restio rarus 
 Restio rigidus 
 Restio rigoratus 
 Restio rivulus 
 Restio rottboellioides 
 Restio rudolfii 
 Restio rupicola 
 Restio sabulosus 
 Restio saroclados 
 Restio saxatilis 
 Restio scaber 
 Restio scaberulus 
 Restio schoenoides 
 Restio secundus 
 Restio sejunctus 
 Restio setiger 
 Restio sieberi 
 Restio similis 
 Restio singularis 
 Restio sporadicus 
 Restio stereocaulis 
 Restio stokoei 
 Restio strictus 
 Restio strobilifer 
 Restio subtilis 
 Restio subverticillatus 
 Restio tenuispicatus 
 Restio tenuissimus 
 Restio tetragonus 
 Restio triflorus 
 Restio triticeus 
 Restio tuberculatus 
 Restio uniflorus 
 Restio unispicatus 
 Restio vallis-simius 
 Restio verrucosus 
 Restio versatilis 
 Restio vilis 
 Restio villosus 
 Restio vimineus 
 Restio virgeus 
 Restio wallichii 
 Restio wittebergensis 
 Restio zuluensis 
 Restio zwartbergensis

Many species formerly included within the genus Restio are now classified into a number of other genera including Acion, Baloskion, and Eurychorda.

References

Further reading 
  

Restionaceae
Endemic flora of South Africa
Flora of KwaZulu-Natal
Flora of the Cape Provinces
Fynbos
Poales genera